Murder House or The Murder House may refer to:

Fiction

Books 
The Murder House, by Alice Muriel Williamson
The Murder House, by James Patterson
The Murder House Trilogy, by Franklin W Dixon
Murder House (The Hardy Boys), final book of the trilogy

Film and TV 
American Horror Story: Murder House
"Murder House" (American Horror Story)

Games 
 Murder House (video game)

Places
"Murder House", a villa outside the walls of Housesteads Roman Fort, where two skeletons were found beneath an apparently newly-laid floor when excavated